Mac Davis was an American country pop artist. His discography consists of 19 studio albums and 38 singles. Of his 38 singles, 30 charted on the U.S. Billboard Hot Country Songs chart between 1970 and 1986.

Studio albums

1970s

1980s and 1990s

Compilations

Singles

1960s and 1970s

1980s

References

External links

Country music discographies
Discographies of American artists